Atif Rehman Mian (born 28 June 1975) is a Pakistani-American economist who serves as the John H. Laporte Jr. Class of 1967 Professor of Economics, Public Policy, and Finance at Princeton University, and as the Director of the Julis-Rabinowitz Center for Public Policy and Finance at the Princeton School of Public and International Affairs. He received a Guggenheim Fellowship in 2021, and was elected Fellow of the Econometric Society in 2021. 

His work focuses on the connections between finance and the macro economy. He is the first person of Pakistani origin to rank among the top 25 young economists of the world. In 2014, the International Monetary Fund (IMF) identified Atif as one of twenty-five young economists who it expects will shape the world's thinking about the global economy in the future.

Early life and education 

Atif grew up and received most of his education in Pakistan before moving to the US for higher education in 1993. He is the youngest in his family and has three older sisters. In 1996, he earned a bachelor's degree in mathematics with computer science from the Massachusetts Institute of Technology, and he completed his doctorate in economics at MIT in 2001. After working as a faculty member at the University of Chicago (2001–2009) and University of California, Berkeley (2009–2012), he joined the Princeton faculty in 2012.

House of Debt 
Atif is the author of the critically acclaimed book House of Debt (with Amir Sufi, University of Chicago Press, 2014). The book argues that debt caused the Great Recession—rather than failing banks, as the Bush and Obama administrations had diagnosed. His book was shortlisted for the Financial Times Business Book of the Year, and it won the Gordon J. Laing Prize of the University of Chicago Press.

EAC appointment
Atif was appointed on 1 September 2018 as a member of an Economic Advisory Council formed by Pakistani Prime Minister Imran Khan to provide assistance on issues of economics and finance. However, since his appointment, the government faced criticism from groups opposed to government representation for religious minorities, because of Atif's Ahmadiyya faith. He was removed from the Economic Advisory Council on 7 September 2018 and afterwards council members Asim Ijaz Khwaja and Imran Rasul resigned in protest.

Atif Mian's quick removal from EAC due to religious discrimination received worldwide condemnation, including an open letter by leading economists including many Nobel laureates. International media outlets such as The Economist and Financial Times also criticised the move.

Recognition
In 2021 Mian was named a Fellow of the Econometric Society. He received a Guggenheim Fellowship in 2021. In 2014, the International Monetary Fund (IMF) identified Atif as one of twenty-five young economists who it expects will shape the world's thinking about the global economy in the future.

References

External links 
Home page

1975 births
American academics of Pakistani descent
American Ahmadis
American Muslims
American economists
Imran Khan administration
Living people
Massachusetts Institute of Technology School of Science alumni
Pakistani Ahmadis
Pakistani economists
Princeton University faculty
University of California, Berkeley faculty
University of Chicago faculty
MIT School of Humanities, Arts, and Social Sciences alumni
Fellows of the Econometric Society